Mersin Marina is a marina at the eastern Mediterranean Sea coast situated in Mersin, Turkey

Geography 

History 

Before the 1970s, Mersin was used to be a stop in scheduled sea voyages of Turkey. But after the maritime operators shortened their cruise destinations, Mersin is no more a stop in scheduled voyages. Instead, it is now planned to be a stop in international yachting tourism. The old marina, which was actually a part of the Mersin Harbour, is found to be insufficient for yacht traffic. While the old marina is now reserved for fishing boats, the new marina was constructed after 1994. In 2006, the operating rights were awarded to ERS İnşaat company within the scope of a build-operate-transfer project.

Facilities
There are two lighthouses, one at each breakwater.

References

Marinas in Turkey
Buildings and structures in Mersin
Tourist attractions in Mersin
2013 Mediterranean Games venues